Clubul Sportiv Municipal Victoria Carei, commonly known as Victoria Carei, is a Romanian football club based in Carei, Satu Mare County and currently playing in the Liga III, the third tier of the Romanian football league system, following their promotion from the Liga IV – Satu Mare County in the 2021–22 season. Founded in 1923 Victoria Carei played sixteen seasons in Liga II and thirty-six seasons in Liga III. Their highest league finish is third, in the 1935–36 season of Divizia B.

History

First years and ascension (1923–1990)
The first appearance in the Romanian divisional system football is recorded in the 1935–36 season of Divizia B - 3rd place. Follow another four consecutive seasons in the Second Division: 1936–37 - 13th place; 1937–38 - 9th place; 1938–39 - 8th place and 1939–40 in which withdrew at the start of the second half and lost the remaining nine matches with 0–3, ranking last and relegated. Also qualified to the second round proper of the 1937–38 Cupa României, eliminated after losing 0–7 with Unirea Tricolor București.

Victoria Carei moved in the Hungarian football league system due to the Second Vienna Award which was signed on 30 August 1940, territory of Northern Transylvania being assigned from Romania to Hungary.

Renamed as Victoria CFR Carei, the club returned to the Romanian football league system for 1946–47 Divizia C, the first season of the third division after the World War II, finishing 6th in the VI series. With the exception of the 1948–49 Divizia C season, in which it finished 4th in Series 2 of Divizia C, the team from Carei, renamed in the meanwhile as CFR and then as Recolta, played in the following seasons in the Regional Championship, due to the Divizia C was not organized until 1956.

Followed three seasons in the third tier, in which Recolta was ranked as follows: 10th in 1956 season, 10th in 1957–58 season and 3rd at the end of 1958–59 season. Due to expansion of Second Division from two series to three series of 14 teams, the teams ranked 3rd in all six series of Divizia C played a promotion play-off, Recolta promoted to Divizia B, after nineteen years of absence, after 1–1 with Aurul Brad and 1–0 with Textila Sfântu Gheorghe. The club remained in the Second Division for the next four seasons finished 5th in 1959–60, 9th in 1960–61, 9th in 1961–62 and 11th in 1962–63 relegated to the Third Division due to another format change of the second tier. 

The 1963–64 season saw the club promoted back to Second Division winning the North Series of Divizia C and reached the first round proper of Cupa României losing 0–4 to Rapid București.

In the 1964–65 season in Divizia B finishing 12th barely avoided relegation and reached again the first round of Cupa României this time losing 0–1 in front of Farul Constanța. The following year Recolta were relegated to Divizia C at goal difference, finishing in 13th place out of 14 with 21 points tied with Minerul Lupeni and CSM Sibiu. 

In the 1966–67 season occupied the 3rd place in the North Series of the Third Division, and in the summer of 1967, the club reverted to its old name, Victoria Carei,  finishing again in 3rd position at the end of the 1967–68 season.

Ups and downs (1990–2007)
In the next four seasons, the club continue to challenge for promotion, finishing 2nd in 1968–69 and 1969–70 seasons, 3rd in 1970–71 and 1st in 1971–72 season, missing the promotion after lost the play-off played against Metrom Brașov (1–3) and Industria Sârmei Câmpia Turzii (0–4).  In the 1972–73 season promoted to Divizia B, ending seven consecutive seasons in the third tier, after won the 10th series of Divizia C.

Victoria spent the next three seasons in the Second Division finishing 7th in 1973–74 season, 14th in 1974–75 season and 17th in  1975–76 season relegated back to Third Division. The 1976–77 campaign saw the club win the Series IX of Divizia C secured an immediate return to the Second Division. However, at the end of the next season they were relegated again after finishing 17th out of 18.

Victoria stayed in Divizia C nine consecutive seasons: In 1978–79 finished on 9th place and qualified to the first round proper of the Cupa României being eliminated after losing 0–1 to Sportul Studențesc, the next season unsuccessfully contested the promotion finishing on 2nd place 3 points behind CIL Sighetu-Marmației, the 5th position from 1980–81 season follows two second places, in 1981–82 four points behind Armătura Zalǎu and 1982–83 at just one points behind Steaua CFR Cluj-Napoca, 12th place 1983–84, 4th place in 1984–85, 5th place in 1985–86 and 3rd place in 1986–87. In the summer of 1987, due to the merger between Unio Satu Mare and Olimpia Satu Mare, Victoria Carei took the place of Unio in 1987–88 season of Divizia B, suffering a immediately relegation ranking last in his series.

In the next seasons of Divizia C, Victoria was a top-table finisher team, but not a serious contender for promotion, ranking as follows: 8th (1988–89), 6th (1989–90), 4th (1990–91), 4th (1991–92), 8th (1992–93), but at the end of 1993–94 season finished in 19th place out of 20 and relegated to the Fourth Division. In the 1996–97 season, Victoria Carei won the Satu Mare County Championship and promoted to Divizia C after defeating the winner of Maramureș County Championship, Progresul Șomcuta Mare, 1–0 in the promotion play-off. The presence in the Third Division was short, at the end of the 1997–98 season relegated back to the Fourth Division after finished 16th in the 4th series. In the 2001–02 season, Victoria Carei promoted again to the Third Division after won Divizia D – Satu Mare County and after beating Rapid Jibou, the winner of Divizia D – Sălaj County, 3–0 at the promotion-play-off.

In Divizia C, Victoria finished two seasons at the mid-table, 8th in 2002–03 and 7th in 2003–04, and two seasons as runners-up in 2004–05 and 2005–06, before relegated again to Liga IV, at the end of the 2006–07 season, after finishing 16th out of 18.

County leagues (2007–2022)
With Florin Fabian on the bench, Victoria won the Liga IV – Satu Mare County in the 2007–08 season, but missed promotion to the 3rd league, after losing the promotion play-off 1–3 to winner of Liga IV – Bihor County, Liberty II Marghita.

In the 2009–10 season, the team from Carei, with Zsolt Tabi as a coach, won again the Liga IV – Satu Mare County, but lost the promotion play-off 0–4 to Spicul Mocira, the winner of Liga IV – Maramureș County.

Led by Marius Botan, Victoria won the 2020–21 season Liga IV – Satu Mare County, but missed promotion after losing 0–3 to Real Bradu, the winner of Liga IV – Argeș County, in the preliminary round of promotion-play-off.

Back in the national leagues (2022–present)
After fifteen years in the Fourth Division, Victoria Carei, under the guidance of Marius Botan, was promoted to Liga III after winning the 2021–22 Liga IV Satu Mare County and the promotion play-off against Supporter 2.0 Cluj-Napoca (1–1 at Cluj and 3–0 at Carei), the winner of Liga IV – Cluj County.

Honours 
Liga III
Winners (4): 1963–64, 1971–72, 1972–73, 1976–77
Runners-up (7): 1968–69, 1969–70, 1979–80, 1981–82, 1982–83, 2004–05, 2005–06

Liga IV  – Satu Mare County
Winners (6): 1996–97, 2001–02, 2007–08, 2009–10, 2020–21, 2021–22
Runners-up (2): 2008–09

Players

First-team squad

Out on loan

Club officials

Board of directors

Current technical staff

League history

References

External links
 FRF-AJF Profile

Association football clubs established in 1923
Liga II clubs
Liga III clubs
Liga IV clubs
Football clubs in Satu Mare County
1923 establishments in Romania